Ich Kämpfe was a book given by the Nazi Party to each new enrollee in 1943, the year in which the Nazi fortunes began to wane during the Second World War. Nearly all copies of this book were destroyed at the end of the war under the Allied policy of denazification, with the result that originals are very rare.

Contents 
The text of Ich Kämpfe was written by leaders of the various paramilitary sections of the Nazi Party describing the alleged success of their movement. There are sections by Joseph Goebbels, Reichsleiters Phillip Bouhler, Alfred Rosenberg, Dr. Robert Ley, Professor Dr. Groß, and Artur Axmann.

The book includes information on the Schutzstaffel (SS), the Sturmabteilung (SA), National Socialist Flyers Corps (NSFK), National Socialist Women's League (NSF), National Socialist Motor Corps (NSKK), loyalty to the Führer, the program of the Nazi Party, the German Concept of Freedom, the National Socialist Revolution, Honor List of the Martyrs of the Movement, Our Will, the Responsibilities of Political Leaders, the National Socialist Way of Life, the Responsibility of Party Members, and the Dates in the History of the NSDAP.

See also 
 Mein Kampf - Hitler's autobiography up to 1926

References

External links 
Pictures and captions from the book; from the Calvin archive of German propaganda 

Nazi books
1943 non-fiction books
Mein Kampf